Pat Byrnes is an American cartoonist best known for his work for The New Yorker. He created the comic strip Monkeyhouse, which ran for three years.  He received the National Cartoonists Society Advertising and Illustration Award for 2001, with an additional nomination for 2000, and nominations for their Gag Cartoon Award for 1999 and 2000. He also draws cartoons for other magazines and illustrates for a variety of ads and publications, and his work is syndicated by Cagle Cartoons.

Education

Byrnes is a 1981 graduate of the University of Notre Dame with a degree in Aerospace Engineering.

References

External links 
 
 NCS Awards, including a biography of Byrnes
 University of Notre Dame archives

Living people
Notre Dame College of Engineering alumni
American cartoonists
Spouses of Illinois politicians
Artists from Detroit
The New Yorker cartoonists
Year of birth missing (living people)